Taeniolethrinops praeorbitalis is a species of cichlid endemic to Lake Malawi where it prefers shallow waters with sandy substrates but can occur as deep as approximately .  This species can reach a length of  TL.  It can also be found in the aquarium trade.

References

praeorbitalis
Fish described in 1922
Taxonomy articles created by Polbot